Pimax is a technology company specializing in virtual reality hardware products.

Pimax Technology was founded in November 2015. In 2016 its first product, the Pimax 4K virtual reality headset, was released, becoming the first commercially available headset with a combined (left + right eye) resolution of 4K. That first product was recognized as the best VR product in Asia at CES 2016. In 2017, they ran a crowdfunding campaign on Kickstarter for the Pimax 8K headset, raising approximately $4.2 million, which held the Guinness World Record for the most successful crowdfunded VR project. On the 19th of December 2017, Pimax announced they had closed a $15 million series A funding round.
On the 8th of January 2020, Pimax’s flagship headset  the world’s first dual native 4K consumer VR headset  Vision 8K X, featuring high resolution and ultra-wide field of view, 200°(D)/170°(H)/115°(V), was selected as Top Tech of CES: AR/VR by Digital Trends. On the 18th of October 2020, Pimax received $20M (USD) series B funding round, announced at World Conference on VR Industry (WCVRI) 2020.

Products

Pimax Technology Portfolio
Pimax Technology LTD portfolio includes 15 patents, 6 trademarks and 9 software work certificates that represent the top level of the global VR industry. In addition to the team's technical precipitation in the field of virtual reality and augmented reality technology and algorithm research for more than 10 years, it has maintained the leading position of VR headset with the highest resolution in the world for a long time.

Product comparison

Kickstarter era

Pimax 4K 
Released in 2016, the Pimax 4K was Pimax's first foray into the VR scene. It boasts a resolution of 1920×2160 per eye, for a combined total of 3840×2160 (thus the "4K" denomination  though not full stereo 4K) running at a refresh rate of 60Hz.

Pimax 8K 
The Pimax 8K is a virtual reality head-mounted display. It features two 4K displays, one for each eye, with an advertised field of view of 200 degrees. However, the Pimax 8K does not use the most common 8K resolution standard 8K UHD which contains four times as many pixels as 4K UHD. Since the Pimax 8K contains two 4K UHD displays, it only has half the number of pixels as that of 8K UHD. In addition, due to bandwidth limitations in the connection cable, the headset's input is limited to 2560×1440 for each of the displays. This is then upscaled in the device to the displays' actual resolution.

The company has announced that they are partnering with third parties to develop expansion modules for the headset. The expansion modules announced include features like inside-out tracking, eye tracking, wireless transmission, and scent.

At CES2019 in January 2019, Pimax disclosed strategic partnerships respectively with Leap Motion and 7INVENSUN on the development of hand motion tracking module and eye tracking module.
Leap Motion was acquired by UltraHaptics in May 2019 and a new company called Ultraleap was established. On the 26th of February, Pimax signed an agreement to offer Ultraleap hand tracking for its whole VR headset range with specifications including a stereoscopic IR camera that creates an interaction zone of up to  range, extending from the device in a 160×160° field of view (approximately 74 cubic feet or 2.1 cubic meters of interactive space).

The headset uses the SteamVR positional tracking system (previously called "Lighthouse") initially developed for the HTC Vive by Valve. This means that existing Vive base stations and controllers are compatible with the Pimax headset, removing the need for existing Vive users to set up an additional tracking system or buy new controllers.

The headset is compatible with SteamVR and Oculus software, making it compatible with a wide range of already existing VR content. It is not a native SteamVR headset, and it requires "PiTool" software to be installed along with it. The project remains in the top 5 list of technology projects to this day and received the Guinness World Record for the most successful Speden-funded VR project.

The headset was initially planned to start shipping in January 2018, but was repeatedly delayed due to design tweaks and manufacturing refinements. As of July 2019 all backers with verified addresses had received their Pimax 8K and 5K+ headsets.

Commercial products

Pimax 5K PLUS 
The Pimax 5K PLUS is based on similar hardware to the Pimax 8K, but features a lower resolution, at 2560×1440 displays per eye instead of 4K.  Since this resolution is accepted as input, the headset eliminates the need for upscaling. Early previews of the devices noted that the 5K PLUS featured a sharper image, while the 8K had a significantly reduced screen-door effect. Launched alongside the 8K, the 5K PLUS units began shipping in large numbers sooner; as of February 2019, a majority of backers had received their headsets, while leaving hundreds of Kickstarter backers waiting for their 8K unit.

Pimax 5K XR 
5K XR is a virtual reality headset that is compatible with most VR software titles for Windows-based PC's. The headset has a resolution of 2560×1440 per eye or a total resolution of 5120x1440. The differentiating factor between the Pimax XR headset and the Pimax 5K PLUS is the XR utilizes OLED screens rather than LCD screens. The term "XR" stands for eXtended Range for the added dynamic color range and the near absolute blacks that are possible for OLED type screens.

Pimax Vision 8K X 
The Pimax Vision 8K X is a variant of the Pimax 8K that solves the cable bandwidth limitation by using the highest data transmission mode with HBC with Displayport 1.4a, thus allowing native 4K resolution per eye, without the visual compromise from upscaling a 5K signal. The total native resolution of a Pimax Vision 8K X is 7680×2160, which should help reduce the screen-door effect.
VISION 8KX offers a Dual Engine Mode, which can lower the render resolution to 2,560* 1,440 per display and then upscale that to 4K.

Pimax showcased its VISION 8K X at CES2020 as their flagship model and it was selected as the Top Tech of CES2020: AR/VR by Digital Trends after hands-on review at CES2020; “The Pimax has something most headsets lack; a real sense of peripheral vision.”  
Right after CES2020, the Pimax team went on to meetups in Orlando, Florida. 
 

Pimax announced it had shipped all address verified 8KX orders on Sept. 30th, 2020.

Pimax Vision 8K PLUS 
The Pimax Vision 8K PLUS is a headset similar to the Vision 8K X, but it takes a 1440p input which it upscales to the 4K panels.

Pimax Reality 12k QLED 
The Pimax Reality 12k QLED is an unreleased next-generation virtual reality headset announced by Pimax on October 25, 2021. The headset is a hybrid standalone and can operate with or without a PC. It is expected to support a 200hz refresh rate and a 200-degree field of view. The headset will not require base stations but an optional faceplate that allows base station operation was announced. It includes an integrated Wifi6e wireless radio and can attach an optional WiGig 60Ghz adapter. The device includes a Tobii eye tracking module with motorized IPD adjustment, foveated rendering, and headset passthrough. It is expected to be released during Q4 of 2022 at an MSRP of $2399.

Pimax Crystal 
The Pimax Crystal is an unreleased virtual reality headset announced by Pimax on May 31st, 2022. The headset is similar to the unreleased Pimax 12K QLED headset and is hybrid standalone that can operate with or without a PC. The announced specifications are up to 160Hz refresh rate, up to a 140 degree diagonal field of view at a pixel density of 42ppd. The panels are QLED type and the lenses are interchangeable optical aspheric glass. The headset was announced to use inside-out tracking and optional lighthouse tracking. The headset has integrated Wifi 6e wireless and an optional 60Ghz WiGig adapter. The headset also integrates eye tracking with a motorized automatic IPD adjustment capability. The Crystal headset is expected to release in Q4 2022 at an MSRP of $1,899.

Pimax Artisan
On December 16, 2019, Pimax published a teaser image of an unannounced headset called Artisan, touting 120 Hz refresh, 140º FOV, and 3200×1440 resolution, with its price only specified as "X49.00".
During CES 2020, Pimax announced that the price of the Artisan will start at $449 for the base model. The device began shipping in April, 2020.

Pimax 5K SUPER 
The 5K SUPER has a standard refresh rate hitting 160 Hz and includes an experimental 180 Hz mode with user selectable refresh rates, fields of view, and 2560x1440 resolution.

References 

Virtual reality companies
Display technology
Companies of China
Electronics companies established in 2015
Software companies established in 2015
Technology companies established in 2015
Chinese companies established in 2015
2015 establishments in China